Pradeep Nepal (born 1954) is a Nepali communist politician belonging to CPN (Unified Socialist). He also a former government minister under Manmohan Adhikari cabinet. He has also a writer, and has published at least 16 novels and ten short stories collections.

Early political career 
Born in January 1954, Nepal spent time in prison as a democracy activist during the Panchayat regime.

Political life 
After the establishment of constitutional monarchy, he became the Minister of Information and Minister of Water Resources in 1994, and Minister of Health and Minister of Water Resources in 1999.

Nepal lost the 2008 constituent assembly election to Nepali Congress' candidate Prakash Man Singh. He was the CPN (UML) candidate for Kathmandu-1 constituency. At the time, he was the Minister of Education and Sports in the interim cabinet of Girija Prasad Koirala that conducted the election.

As of November 2009, Nepal was a polit-buro member of CPN UML.

References

1954 births
Communist Party of Nepal (Unified Socialist) politicians
Nepalese democracy activists
Nepalese writers
20th-century Nepalese politicians
21st-century Nepalese politicians
20th-century Nepalese writers
21st-century Nepalese writers
Nepalese male novelists
Place of birth missing (living people)
Living people
Nepal MPs 1999–2002
Members of the National Assembly (Nepal)